Gastropacha is a genus of moths in the family Lasiocampidae. It was first described by Ochsenheimer in 1810.

Species
Gastropacha acutifolia Roepke, 1953
Gastropacha caesarea Zolotuhin & Witt, 2005
Gastropacha clathrata Bryk, 1948
Gastropacha deruna Moore, 1859
Gastropacha eberti de Lajonquière, 1967
Gastropacha hauensteini Zolotuhin, 2005
Gastropacha hoenei De Lajonquière, 1976
Gastropacha horishana Matsumura, 1927
Gastropacha horishana egregia Zolotuhin, 2005
Gastropacha insularis Zolotuhin, 2005
Gastropacha moorei Zolotuhin, 2005
Gastropacha pardale (Walker, 1855)
Gastropacha pardale sinensis Tams, 1935
Gastropacha pelengata Zolotuhin & J.D. Holloway, 2006
Gastropacha philippinensis Tams, 1935
Gastropacha philippinensis swanni Tams, 1935
Gastropacha populifolia (Esper, 1784)
Gastropacha populifolia angustipennis (Walker, 1855)
Gastropacha populifolia mephisto Zolotuhin, 2005
Gastropacha prionophora Tams, 1935
Gastropacha quercifolia (Linnaeus, 1758)
Gastropacha quercifolia mekongensis De Lajonquière, 1976
Gastropacha quercifolia thibetana De Lajonquière, 1976
Gastropacha remnaumovi Zolotuhin, 2005
Gastropacha sikkima Moore, 1879
Gastropacha watanabei Okano, 1966
Gastropacha xenapates Tams, 1935

References

External links

Lasiocampidae